The 2009 Men's Hockey Champions Trophy was the 31st edition of the Hockey Champions Trophy men's field hockey tournament. It was held from 28 November to 6 December 2009 in Melbourne, Australia.

Teams
The International Hockey Federation announce the qualified teams for this event on 12 November 2008.

 (host and defending champions)
 (2008 Olympic champions and 2006 World Cup champions)
 (Second in the 2008 Olympics)
 (Fourth in the 2008 Olympics)
 (Fifth in the 2008 Olympics as Great Britain)
 (Sixth in the 2008 Olympics)

Results
All times are Eastern Daylight Time (UTC+11:00)

Pool

Classification

Fifth and sixth place

Third and fourth place

Final

Awards

Final standings

References

External links
Official FIH website

C
Hockey
Champions Trophy (field hockey)
2009